Issac Oppong Osae (born 18 August 1993) is a Ghanaian footballer who currently plays for Penn FC in the USL.

Career
On 6 April 2018, Osae signed with United Soccer League side Penn FC on loan from Inter Allies.

References

External links

1993 births
Living people
Ghanaian footballers
Ghanaian expatriate footballers
Heart of Lions F.C. players
Al-Orobah FC players
International Allies F.C. players
Penn FC players
Saudi Professional League players
USL Championship players
Association football midfielders
Ghanaian expatriate sportspeople in Saudi Arabia
Expatriate footballers in Saudi Arabia
Ghanaian expatriate sportspeople in the United States
Expatriate soccer players in the United States
Footballers from Accra